The 1977–78 DDR-Oberliga was the 29th season of the DDR-Oberliga, the first tier of league football in East Germany.

The league was contested by fourteen teams. Dynamo Dresden won the championship, the club's sixth of eight East German championships, thereby equalling FC Vorwärts Berlin's record.

Klaus Havenstein of BSG Chemie Böhlen was the league's top scorer with 15 goals, while Jürgen Croy of BSG Sachsenring Zwickau won the seasons East German Footballer of the year award for a record third time.

On the strength of the 1977–78 title Dresden qualified for the 1978–79 European Cup where the club was knocked out by FK Austria Wien in the quarter finals. Second-placed club 1. FC Magdeburg qualified for the 1978–79 European Cup Winners' Cup as the seasons FDGB-Pokal winners and was knocked out by Baník Ostrava in the quarter finals. For the first time three East German clubs qualified for the 1978–79 UEFA Cup with third-placed BFC Dynamo being knocked out in the first round by Red Star Belgrade while fourth-placed 1. FC Lokomotive Leipzig lost to Arsenal, also in the first round and fifth-placed FC Carl Zeiss Jena was defeated by MSV Duisburg in the second round.

Table									
The 1977–78 season saw two newly promoted clubs BSG Chemie Böhlen and BSG Wismut Gera.

Results

References

Sources

External links
 Das Deutsche Fussball Archiv  Historic German league tables

1977–78 in German football leagues
1977-78
1